Pechengsky District is an administrative district (raion), one of the six in Murmansk Oblast, Russia. As a municipal division, it is incorporated as Pechengsky Municipal District. It is located in the northwest of the oblast, on the coast of the Barents Sea (by the Rybachy Peninsula, which is a part of the district) and borders Finland in the south and southwest and Norway in the west, northwest, and north. Its administrative center is the urban locality (an urban-type settlement) of Nikel. Its population was  The population of Nikel accounts for 32.8% of the district's total population.

History

Russian settlement
The area was long inhabited by the indigenous Sami people. The border between Norway and Russia was not defined in terms of land, instead the Treaty of Novgorod (1326) specified which indigenous, nomadic families had to pay their taxes to which government. In 1533, the settlement of the Pechenga Monastery was defined as part of Russia.

Inspired by the model of the Solovetsky Monastery, Tryphon wished to convert the local Skolt Sami population to Christianity and to demonstrate how faith could flourish in the most inhospitable lands.

The area was resettled by the Pomors and other Russians. The present border between Norway and Russia was settled in 1826, and the development of the area considerably accelerated in the late 19th century, when the monastery was re-established there. The harbor of Liinakhamari in Petsamo was important for the Russian economy during World War I as the Baltic Sea was blocked by the Germans.

Finnish control
According  to the 1920 Treaty of Tartu that  followed Finnish  occuрation of the  region, Soviet Russia ceded the area of Pechenga (Petsamo Province) to Finland.

Deposits of nickel were found in 1921, after Petsamo became a part of Finland. In 1934, the deposits were estimated at over five million tonnes. Mining operations were started in 1935 by Canadian and French corporations.

Construction of a road from Sodankylä through Ivalo to Liinakhamari started in 1916 and was completed in 1931. This made Petsamo a popular tourist attraction, as it was the only port by the Barents Sea reachable by automobile.

In the Winter War of 1939–1940, the Soviet Union briefly occupied Petsamo.

In 1941, during World War II, Petsamo was used by Nazi Germany as a staging area for the offensive towards Murmansk. In 1944, the Red Army occupied Petsamo again, and this time Finland had to cede it to the Soviet Union as part of the Moscow Armistice signed on September 19, 1944 that halted fighting in the Continuation War. On July 21, 1945, the Presidium of the Supreme Soviet of the Soviet Union decreed the establishment of Pechengsky District with the administrative center in Nikel on the ceded territory and to include this district as a part of Murmansk Oblast.

In 1947, Finland exchanged the remaining  Rayakoski area, together with the Jäniskoski hydroelectric plant, for Soviet-confiscated German investments in Finland.

Retrocession to Russia
Following the Paris Peace Treaty, the local Skolt Sami were given the choice of staying in Soviet Russia or moving to Finland. Most opted to re-settle in Finland,  but  some chose to stay in  Russia.

When Polyarny District was abolished on July 9, 1960, a part of its territory was transferred to Pechengsky District.

On December 26, 1962, when the Presidium of the Supreme Soviet of the RSFSR decreed the reorganisation of the Soviets of People's Deputies and the executive committees of the krais, oblasts, and districts into the industrial and agricultural soviets, Murmansk Oblast was not affected and kept one unified Oblast Soviet and the executive committee. Nevertheless, on February 1, 1963, the Decree by the Presidium of the Supreme Soviet of the RSFSR established the new structure of the districts of Murmansk Oblast, which classified Pechengsky District as rural. However, this classification only lasted for less than two years. The November 21, 1964 Decree by the Presidium of the Supreme Soviet of the RSFSR restored the unified Soviets of People's Deputies and the executive committees of the krais and oblasts where the division into the urban and rural districts was introduced in 1962, and the districts of Murmansk Oblast were re-categorized as regular districts again by the January 12, 1965 Presidium of the Supreme Soviet of the RSFSR Decree.

Economy
The district is important for its ice-free harbor, Liinakhamari, and the deposits of nickel.

See also
Nemetsky Peninsula

References

Notes

Sources

External links

Official website of Pechengsky District 
Unofficial website of Pechengsky District 
News of Pechengsky District 
SIIDA. From Petsamo to Inari (Skolt Sámi history)

 
Districts of Murmansk Oblast
Barents Sea
Geographic history of Finland
Finland–Soviet Union relations